The Australian Classification Board (ACB or CB) is an Australian government statutory body responsible for the classification and censorship of films, video games and publications for exhibition, sale or hire in Australia. The ACB was established in 1970 and was once part of the Office of Film and Literature Classification (OFLC), which was dissolved in 2006. The Department of Communications and the Arts provided administrative support to the ACB from 2006 until 2020, when it was merged into the 'mega department' of the Department of Infrastructure, Transport, Regional Development and Communications. Decisions made by the ACB may be reviewed by the Australian Classification Review Board. The ACB now operates under the Commonwealth Classification Act 1995. The ACB is made up of a director, a deputy director, and three other board members, appointed by the government for three- or four-year terms, and temporary board members. The ACB is located in Sydney, New South Wales.

The ACB does not directly censor material by ordering cuts or changes. However, it is able to effectively censor media by refusing classification and making the media illegal for hire, exhibition and importation to Australia.

The classification system has several levels of "restricted" categories, prohibiting sale, exhibition or use of some materials to those who are under a prescribed age. In 2005, video and computer games became subject to the same classification ratings and restrictions as films (with the exception of the R18+ and X18+ ratings), in response to confusion by parents. Despite a line in the National Classification Code stating that "adults should be able to read, hear and see what they want", the adult R18+ classification was not applied to video games in Australia until 1 January 2013.

Some films (those made for educational or training purposes, for instance) are exempt from classification under certain conditions. Film festivals and institutions such as Australian Centre for the Moving Image (ACMI) may apply to the ACB for an exemption from classification for the purpose of screening at a particular film festival or event. If the ACB believes an unclassified work, in their estimation, would receive an X18+ classification if it were to be classified they would not grant an exemption for public screening, as an X18+ cannot be exhibited. The ACB may require film festivals to have age-restricted entrance to a festival or screening.

History 
The Australian Classification Board was created in 1970 to classify or rate all films (and later in 1994, video games) that came into Australia. In the early years of the system, beginning in November 1971, there were four ratings.

G for " general audiences"
PG for "parental guidance suggested for under 15"
M for "suggested for 13 and over" (later became M 15+ from the late 1980s until 2005)
R for "restricted exhibition" (previously SOA or "suitable only for adults". This later became R 18+ in the late 1980s)

The MA 15+ rating was introduced in 1993, to flag content that was too strong for the M classification, but not so much so that the content should be restricted only to persons over the age of 18.

The Office of Film and Literature Classification (OFLC) was reorganised in 1994, and oversaw the ACB. In 2005 the OFLC was dissolved and supervision of the ACB transferred to the attorney-general's department.

The current colour-coded classification markings for films and computer games were introduced in May 2005.

In August 2014, the ACB introduced amendments to allow for the automated classification process employed by the International Age Rating Coalition. This new process reduces the costs of video game developers as they seek to obtain ratings for their products that are distributed digitally online.

Overview 
The board operates on a procedure that primarily involves decision-making. The members must communicate their views clearly and appreciate the views of others. Board members would be exposed to a wide range of material, including content that is confronting and offensive. Every film and computer game has to be classified before it can be legally made available to the public. Some publications also need to be classified. Failure to give classification (especially for unclassified material that is likely to be classified RC) is an implicit ban (except for exempt films, games, and publications). It is an offence "to display, demonstrate, sell, hire, publicly exhibit or advertise a film or computer game" without having it classified. Some films and documentaries (such as current affairs and those created for business, scientific and education purposes) are exempt from classification unless, if classified, they would be M or above.

There are legal age restrictions for the ratings of MA 15+ and R 18+. X 18+ is a special restriction rating for adult content. X 18+ is limited only to films, and the highest rating for video games remains R 18+. Should a game contain content not suitable for or exceeding the boundaries of an R 18+ rating (often explicit sexual content or nudity), that game is usually either modified (censored) or, rarely, refused classification (banned) (an exception to this was made for The Last of Us Part II, where the game was not censored despite containing nudity). The other classification categories (G, PG and M) are merely recommendations and they are not submitted to legal age restrictions. RC (banned) material cannot be sold, hired or distributed to any persons. A film or video game's context is crucial in determining whether a classifiable element is justified by the story-line or themes.

The ACB decides what consumer advice accompanies each classification. They indicate the elements in films and computer games which caused the classification and help consumers make choices about what they read, view or play. There are six classifiable elements for films: themes (rape, suicide, racism, etc.), violence (the level of violence and how threatening it is in its context), sex (intercourse and references to sex), language (the level of coarse language), drug use (the use of, and references to, drugs) and nudity (the explicitness of nudity). Consumer advice appears with the classification symbol on products, packaging and in advertisements. Consumer advice is not given if the element in question would be acceptable at a lower classification. By August 2020, the ACB added another category for video games related to microtransactions, with any game including them listing in-game purchases alongside these other themes.

The ACB also classifies material submitted by the police, the Australian Customs and Border Protection Service and the Australian Communications and Media Authority. The board does not classify live performances, audio CDs and television shows. Television is regulated by the Australian Communications and Media Authority. Film classification also normally applies to Internet streaming services. In January 2019, for the first time, Netflix was given the go-ahead to self-regulate film and television classification on its streaming platform, allowing the company to rank content between G and R18+.

Film and video game classifications

Unrestricted/Advisory 
The classifications below are unrestricted and may suggest parental advisory, but do not impose any legal restrictions on access to or distribution of material.

Restricted 
By contrast, the classifications below are legally restricted: it is illegal to sell or exhibit material classified to anyone younger than the mentioned minimum age.

Other labels

Literature ratings 
Publications such as books and magazines (though they would also include other printed media such as calendars, cards and catalogues) are required to be classified if they contain depictions or descriptions of sexuality, drugs, nudity or violence that are unsuitable for a minor or an adult who would take offence if sold as an unrestricted publication.

Publication classifications are most commonly applied to magazines with visual depictions of nudity or sexual activity, such as many men's magazines. It is uncommon for these ratings to appear on books, even those dealing with adult themes, except in the most controversial cases.

Proposals

Age reference removal 
In February 2020, the board proposed to remove the reference to 15 years for PG and M classifications and simply just refer to the severity of the material. This is due to a confusion that is caused by each of the categories citing to a 15-year-old, in addition to both the PG and M content not being recommended for persons under 15 years. The age reference created confusion for parents and guardians, creating some questions, such as why an M level film can still be accessed by a person under 15 without guidance because it is not a legally restricted category, when the impact of its material is higher than that of PG material. There is a confusion for people that comes from knowing the suited audience for PG, M and MA 15+ films and games due to their definitions that revolve around 15 years of age. The notes in the guidelines that come with the PG, M and MA ratings should be read like this:

 PG: "Content classified PG may not be of interest to a child or young person. Some content may contain material which some children and young people may find confusing or upsetting and parental guidance is recommended."
 M: "Content classified M is not suitable for children. Parental guidance may be required for young people."
 MA 15+: "Content classified MA 15+ is legally restricted to people aged 15 years and over. However, young people aged under 15 years can legally access this content when accompanied by an adult who may need to provide guidance. "

New rating category 
In February 2020, the board had suggested the adoption of a PG-13-type classification category, which is a rating aimed at young teens (between PG and M), that addresses the mild+ impact level material. Its adoption was suggested because many films in recent years surpass what conforms to the PG rating and are, consequentially, pushed up into an M ("moderate impact") rating category due to their dark themes and peril, despite being films aimed at younger teens. The mild+ category, if introduced, could excel the mild impact level (PG), but not so as to require a mature perspective (M classification) and it could be relevant for films with a more significant amount of action or fantasy violence. If the rating is implemented, the non-restricted classifications would read like this:

 G – General (very mild impact)
 PG – Parental guidance (mild impact)
 Young person (mild+ impact)
 M – Mature (moderate impact)

This would mean the age restrictive numbers (15 and 18) would only be present for the legally-restricted categories of MA 15+, R 18+ and X 18+. The ACB is not suggesting that the new PG-13 rating would be applied retrospectively, but rather prospectively, as was the case when the MA 15+ category was initiated and when the R 18+ was adopted for video games. The ACB is also not planning to use the PG-13 title for the new classification category, but a title that does not reference any age, such as YP for "young person" (or, likely, T for "teenager").

Literature classification 
The ACB considers the present classification categories for publications to be redundant, complex, and inappropriate for the digital world. Therefore, the board has proposed the creation of the equivalent film and games classifications of M, R 18+ and X 18+ for publications, like:

 Unrestricted publication classification – M 
 Category 1 Restricted publication classification – R 18+
 Category 2 Restricted publication classification – X 18+

Controversies

Film 

 Pasolini's Salò, or the 120 Days of Sodom has twice been banned in Australia. The Home Affairs Minister, Brendan O'Connor, asked the Classification Review Board to reassess the decision; however, the review failed to find any fault in the classification. The film was banned in 1997, and was released after two failed attempts in September 2010, when the ACB classified an uncut version of Salò R18+, mainly due to extra material providing greater context.
 In 1992, Island World Communications Ltd and Manga Entertainment Australia Ltd had Urotsukidoji: Legend of the Overfiend submitted to the OFLC. It was the first animated feature to be banned in Australia and the feature was banned outright, similar to Violence Jack. Urotsukidoji was then censored to meet the OFLC's standards. The Australian version is the most censored in the Western world. Many fans of anime imported uncensored versions of Urotsukidoji: Legend of the Overfiend from the UK. The rest of the Urotsukidoji series was censored in Australia, with many still importing or downloading the American versions.
 Ninja Scroll was originally released in 1994 in Australia by Manga Entertainment Ltd. It originally had the MA15+ rating on the VHS, but this was overturned in 1997 when Phillip Ruddock had the anime reviewed after an uncut screening of the movie on the SBS. A few months later it was given an R18+ rating and was uncut, then edited again, eventually using the BBFC cut of it. This was overturned in 2003 when Madman Entertainment and Manga Entertainment Ltd. released the uncut version.
 Romance, a new crop within the arthouse genre, which features short scenes of actual sex began to attract closer scrutiny. The film was initially refused classification in Australia, before it was awarded an R18+ on appeal. It single-handedly paved the way for actual sex to be accommodated in the R18+ classification in Australia.
 Baise-moi, a French film about two prostitutes who take violent revenge after being raped. In 2000, the film was classified as R18+. On 10 May 2002, The film was subsequently banned and pulled from cinemas and still remains prohibited in Australia to this day due to exploitative and offensive depictions of sexual violence, extreme violence and depictions of behavior and fetishes that are considered offensive or abhorrent.
 Ken Park, an American film about teenagers that features a scene of autoerotic asphyxiation, amongst other sexually explicit scenes. The ban, however, is actually due to exploitative sexual depiction of minors, which is a criminal offence in Australia. In response to the ban, a protest screening was held which was shut down by the police. 
 Prominent movie reviewer Margaret Pomeranz, then host of The Movie Show on the SBS, was arrested (and later cautioned and released) along with several others after attempting to screen at a hall what she described as "a wonderful film". Tom Gleisner, host of The Panel (a prime-time comedy show), openly stated on the show that he had downloaded and watched the film.
 Former New South Wales Premier Bob Carr stated that he thought the banning of Ken Park and other films was inappropriate, and that his attorney-general, Bob Debus, would discuss changing the laws with other state attorneys-general at an upcoming meeting.
 In October 2017 the classification board was described as homophobic by Luke Buckmaster on flicks.com.au for classifying the film Tom of Finland as R18+ for high impact sexualised imagery and nudity. The board disputed the allegation, stating that it had classified the film in accordance with its published guidelines and that the distributor had sought R18+ conditions for its screenings at the 2017 Scandinavian Film Festival. Buckmaster also compared what he perceived to be the board's heavy-handed approach unfavorably to Netflix, which he argued was permitted to regulate its own content. The board disagreed with this comparison, noting that it was piloting a scheme to streamline the classification of Netflix content in Australia.

Video games 

Video gaming censorship in Australia is considered to be one of the strictest in the Western world. Such controversial and noteworthy cases include:

 Grand Theft Auto III was withdrawn from sale for allowing players to have sexual intercourse with prostitutes; the game was later reinstated when this action was removed. Specifically, the player could solicit intercourse from a prostitute, and then kill her. The ability to solicit sex from prostitutes in the game was the action that was removed, but in-game characters and pedestrians could still violently murder them. Grand Theft Auto: Vice City was also pre-censored for the same reasons. Though, in 2010 Vice City was classified uncut again receiving an MA15+ and an uncensored version of GTA 3 was given an R18+ in 2019.
 Grand Theft Auto: San Andreas was withdrawn from sale in July 2005 following the revelation that an interactive sex minigame was included in the content files on the game's disc; one could not ordinarily access this, but a third party modification, known as the Hot Coffee mod, allowed the player to access the minigame and the inclusion of the scenes on the game disc took the game outside the MA15+ category. The MA15+ rating was re-instated after a modified version was released worldwide by Rockstar Games, removing the content files for the sex scenes.
 Grand Theft Auto IV was also pre-censored prior to classification and release in the Australian region. In the American release, sexual encounters with prostitutes occur inside the player's vehicle and the player has the ability to rotate the camera for a clearer view of what transpires. In the censored Australian version, the camera is fixed behind the vehicle, which rocks from side to side with accompanying audio effects. It is impossible for the player to view the inside of the car. Rockstar later submitted the uncut version of the game, which went on to receive the same MA15+ rating as its censored counterpart, and a patch was released for the PS3, PC and Xbox 360 to uncensor the game.
 50 Cent: Bulletproof was banned for encouraging gang violence. A version removing the game's arcade mode, cutting down on gore, and with an automatic game over for killing innocents was given an MA15+ rating.
 Fallout 3 was refused classification by the OFLC due to the "realistic visual representations of drugs and their delivery method (bringing) the 'science-fiction' drugs in line with 'real-world' drugs." A revised version of the game was resubmitted to the OFLC and reclassified as MA15+ on 7 August 2008 after drug names were changed. It was later clarified that the only change done to the final version of the game was the name "morphine" changed to "Med-x". This change was done to all versions worldwide; thus, Australia got the same version of the game as other countries uncut with an MA15+.
 Atelier Totori Plus: The Adventurer of Arland was given an R18+ rating on PlayStation Vita, a huge jump from the PS3 version's PG rating, with the reason being "references to sexual violence". Comparatively, in North America, the game received a T for Teen (ages 13+) rating, a 12+ rating in Japan (CERO B), and a PEGI 12 rating. Its strict rating resulted in the creation of an internet meme captioned "High Impact Violence" that satirizes the Classification Board for labeling mildly sensual animation as having "high impact".

Adult (18+) ratings for video games 
Many games were banned before 2011 on the basis that the R18+ rating did not apply to video games at the time. This was the subject of complaint in the gaming community, who argued that there is no reason why adults should be prevented from seeing content in games that they could see in a film. One of the main opponents to the introduction of an R18+ rating for video games was the former South Australian attorney-general, Michael Atkinson, who vetoed every attempt to include one.

On 11 August 2010, at a public forum, opposition leader Tony Abbott was asked a question about his views on the absence of an R18+ rating for video games and whether he had any policies relating to the subject, saying, "if what happens with video games is not roughly analogous to what happens in other areas, that seems silly ... Instinctively I'm with you, and it's something I'd be happy to look at, if we are in Government." In December 2010, Attorney General Robert McClelland appeared to be moving on this issue following the release of telephone poll results conducted by the Minister for Home Affairs Brendan O'Connor, showing roughly 80% in support of an R18+ classification.

On 22 July 2011, at a meeting of state and territories' attorneys general, an agreement was reached for the introduction of an R18+ classification. It was planned to introduce the rating towards the end of 2011.
On 22 July 2011, a meeting of attorneys-general produced an in-principle agreement to introduce the R18+ classification for video games; however, NSW Attorney-General Greg Smith abstained from the vote. The Home Affairs Minister, Brendan O'Connor, said the federal government would over-ride NSW and implement the R18+ rating regardless of its decision and would be officially available before the end of 2011. On 10 August the NSW Attorney General agreed on the R18+; thus, the rating would be accepted and available to all states before the end of 2011.

As of 1 January 2013, the R18+ rating has been officially implemented for video games although it is apparently not being used to full effect as many games are still being refused classification.

The first game to be released with an R18+ rating was Ninja Gaiden Sigma 2 Plus. The game Saints Row IV became the first game to be refused classification under the new standard on 25 June 2013. State of Decay became the second game to be refused classification less than 24 hours after the first (Saints Row IV) was banned. Both were refused classification on the grounds of "illicit or proscribed drug use related to incentives and rewards".

See also 

 Censorship in Australia
 Internet censorship in Australia
 List of pornography laws by region – Australian hardcore pornography laws
 Australian Commercial Television Code of Practice – includes the rating system of Australian TV
 Video game controversy – includes the history of games censorship in Australia
 List of banned video games in Australia

References

External links
 The Australian Government Classification Website Includes info about classification system, board member profiles and a public searchable database of classification decisions
 The R18+ Discussion Paper Submissions due 28 February 2010.
 Inside Film Magazine's Phillip Cenere reports on the ACB International Ratings Conference
 Refused-Classification.com Database of films, games, and books that have had problems with the ACB.
 Libertus Australia Website maintained by Irene Graham, the executive director of EFA.
 Media Censorship in Australia A Facebook censorship news page started in 2013 with several updates a week.

1970 establishments in Australia
Australian classification system
Censorship in Australia
Film organisations in Australia
Commonwealth Government agencies of Australia
Video game content ratings systems
Video game organizations
Motion picture rating systems
Entertainment rating organizations